Foreign diplomatic relations between Australia and India are well-established, with both nations sharing a "Comprehensive Strategic Partnership" since both were part of the British Empire. Both are members of the Commonwealth of Nations, and share political, economic, security, lingual and sporting ties. Besides strong trading & migration, culture, arts, music, commercial & international sports like cricket, tennis, badminton have emerged as a strong cultural connection between the two nations. Military cooperation between Australia and India includes the regular joint naval exercise AUSINDEX.

History

Pre-1788 

Prior to colonisation of Australia, there is evidence of ancient migration of Indians to Australia around 4,000 to 5,000 years ago based on DNA and language development in native Indians and Indigenous Australians according to a recent study.

1788–1947: Colonial era 

The ties between Australia and India started immediately following European settlement of Australia in 1788. On the founding of the penal colony of New South Wales, all trade to and from the colony was controlled by the British East India Company, although this was widely flouted. An early ship built in India from Calcutta, the newly renamed Sydney Cove was marooned, with its cargo of rum, off Tasmania, and the crew (including 12 Indian lascars) made a journey in 1796 CE, initially rowing a long boat, and then a long trek from Tasmania to Sydney, with only one Indian and two British sailors surviving.

The Western Australian town of Australind (est. 1841) is a portmanteau word named after Australia and India. Mangalore city is present in both India and Australia (Mangalore, Karnataka, Mangalore, Victoria, Mangalore, Tasmania and Mangalore, Queensland). Australian towns of Cervantes, Northampton and Madura (est. 1876) were used for breeding cavalry horses for the British Indian Army during the late 19th century.  The horses were used in the North-West Frontier Province (now Pakistan).

In the early colonies, Indians were brought to Australia as labourers and domestic workers, with migration being curtailed after federation.  Gradual migration during the later years of the White Australia policy saw workers moving to Australia especially during periods of labour shortage, such as the Sikhs in Woolgoolga.

1947–present: After Indian Independence 

After World War II, the Australian government of Ben Chifley supported the independence of India from the British Empire to act as a frontier against communism. Later, under Robert Menzies, Australia supported the admission of India as a Republic to the Commonwealth Nations. In 1950, Menzies became the first Australian Prime Minister to visit India, where he met with the Governor-General Chakravarti Rajagopalachari and Prime Minister Jawaharlal Nehru.

As part of the Colombo Plan, many Indian students were sponsored to come and study in Australia in the 1950s and 1960s.  Easing of restrictions in the late 1960s saw an increase in non-European Indians migrating to Australia especially professionals.  In 2011–12, Indians were the largest source of permanent migration to Australia. Australia is also the second most popular destination for Indian university students, with nearly 60,000 Indians on student visa in Australia in 2017.

After independence, Australia has maintained relations with both India and Pakistan, with some concern from India over defence sales over the border such as 50 Mirage fighter jets and parts in 2007.

Diplomatic relations

India first established a Trade Office in Sydney, Australia in 1941. It is currently represented by a High Commissioner in the Indian High Commission at Canberra and Consulate generals in Sydney, Perth and Melbourne. Australia has a High Commission in New Delhi, India and Consulates in Mumbai and Chennai. In early 2018, the Australian government announced that a Consulate-General in Kolkata would be established particularly to encourage business with India's growing mining sector.

Besides both being members of the Commonwealth of Nations, both nations are founding members of the United Nations, and members of regional organisations including the Indian Ocean Rim Association for Regional Cooperation and ASEAN Regional forum.

Australia has traditionally supported India's position on Arunachal Pradesh, which is subject to diplomatic disputes between India and the People's Republic of China.

The Sydney Hilton Hotel bombing, a botched attempt to allegedly assassinate the Indian prime minister at a Commonwealth Heads of Government Meeting in 1978 received significant attention at the time.

Although Australia and India sometimes had divergent strategic perspectives during the Cold War, in recent years there have been much closer security relations, including a Joint Declaration on Security Cooperation in 2009.

Recent visits by Indian and Australian prime ministers, such as Tony Abbott's visit in 2014, and later the same year Narendra Modi's visit to Australia - the latter being the first by an Indian prime minister in 28 years, and Malcolm Turnbull's visit in 2017 have continued to progress the relationship.

Australian PM Scott Morrison was scheduled to visit New Delhi in January 2020, but had postponed it due to the bush fires in Australia. The rescheduled plan for May was put on hold due to the outbreak of COVID-19.

Prime Minister Narendra Modi has held his first virtual bilateral summit on 4 June, as he hopes to expand the strategic partnership with Australia in the backdrop of China's renewed efforts to step up aggression in the Indo-Pacific region. The summit is happening also amid new tensions between China and Australia over Canberra's call for a global inquiry into the origin of COVID-19. Prime Minister Scott Morrison also made "ScoMosas" and in their virtual summit, they even held talks for strengthening their military alliance.

In March 2022, Australia returned 29 antiquities to India, as part of India's efforts to reclaim its cultural heritage from around the world. The artifacts date back to various time periods, and primarily include sculptures and paintings composed of sandstone, marble, bronze, brass and paper.

Trade

Economic relations

While India was Australia's first major trading partner with imports through the East India Company, exports from Australia to India dates back to the late 18th century and early 19th century, when coal from Sydney and horses from New South Wales were exported to India. , bilateral trade between the two countries totaled A$21.9 billion, having grown from A$4.3 billion in 2003.  Australian prime minister Malcolm Turnbull said Australia and India's $20 billion two-way trade was "a fraction of what we should aspire to, given the many points of intersection between our economies". Trade is highly skewed towards Australia. Australia mainly exports Coal, services (mainly education), vegetables for consumer consumption, gold, copper ores and concentrates, while India's chief exports are refined petroleum,  services (professional services such as outsourcing), medicaments, pearls, gems and jewelry. Over 97,000 Indian students enrolled in Australia in 2008, representing an education export of A$2 billion.  The Census 2016 of Australia reveals it is home to more migrants from Asia than from Europe

In the year 2015-16, the total value of trade between Australia and India was A$19.4 billion, a significant increase over the preceding decade. Australian exports included coal, vegetables and gold, and Indian exports included refined petroleum, medicines and business services.

India and Australia have established a $100 million Strategic Research Fund.

Uranium export to India

After a series of attempts by prime ministers of all parties John Howard, Kevin Rudd, Julia Gillard, and Tony Abbott eventually in 2016 under Malcolm Turnbull, both Australian political parties opened the door for uranium exports, with trade potentially starting in 2017.

Trade agreement

A notable exception from the Australia and India relationship has been a free trade agreement.  Despite warm relationships between India and Australia, a promised free trade agreement seems unlikely, with Australian prime minister Malcolm Turnbull suggesting after his 2017 visit with his counterpart Narendra Modi "It may be that the conclusion will be reached that the parties are too far apart to enable a deal to be reached at this time".  Attempts by India to encourage overseas workers in Australia through the loosening of the 457 visa may also have failed as the government attempts to curb, end and/or replace the visa class traditionally used by Indian IT workers.

On 2nd April 2022, India-Australia Economic Cooperation and Trade Agreement (IndAus ECTA) was signed between the two countries to enhance bilateral economic cooperation and increase trade.  

The agreement was signed by Piyush Goyal, Union Minister of Commerce and Industry, Consumer Affairs, Food and Public Distribution and Textiles, Government of India and Dan Tehan, the Minister for Trade, Tourism and Investment, Government of Australia in a virtual ceremony, in the presence of Prime Minister of India, Narendra Modi and the Prime Minister of Australia, Scott Morrison.

Military relations

India and Australia have a long history of military relations, going back before independence when Indian soldiers fought alongside Australian soldiers in a number of campaigns, including both World Wars, such as the 15,000 Indian soldiers who fought with Australians at Gallipoli. Every two years, Australia and India also conduct a joint naval exercise in the Indian Ocean, called AUSINDEX. In 2019, AUSINDEX focused on anti-submarine warfare.

After independence, Australia offered military aid to India in 1963 in response to the Sino-Indian War.

In recent times, India and Australia conducted a joint naval exercise, termed Malabar 2007, in the Indian Ocean alongside the US and Japan.

Some commentators have suggested that there are considerable opportunities for defence and security cooperation between India and Australia.  Potential areas in maritime security include in naval exercises and training (such as use of the Australian Submarine Escape Training facility in Fremantle), greater cooperation in humanitarian and disaster relief operations and search and rescue, maritime border protection and maritime domain awareness.  There are also opportunities for greater cooperation between the Indian and Australian armies and air forces (reflecting the greater use of shared platforms).

Prime Ministers Abbott and Modi signed a landmark deal to increase their nations defence relationship in November 2014. Part of the framework for security co-operation includes annual Prime Ministerial meetings and joint maritime exercises. Areas of increased co-operation include counter-terrorism, border control and regional and international institutions. Prime Minister Modi stated in an address to the Australian parliament that "This is a natural partnership emerging from our shared values and interests and strategic maritime locations...Security and defence are important and growing areas of the new India-Australia partnership for advancing regional peace and stability and combating terrorism and transnational crimes"

On 4 June 2020, India and Australia signed an agreement to provide access to one another's military bases, in order to help facilitate joint military exercises. Known as the Mutual Logistics Support Agreement, it allows each country to use the other's bases for the refuelling and maintenance of aircraft and naval vessels. The agreement was reached over a virtual summit between Prime Ministers Narendra Modi and Scott Morrison due to the COVID-19 pandemic.

Sport

Cricket

A prominent sports passion in both Commonwealth countries is professional cricket. In 1945, the Australian Services cricket team toured India during their return to Australia for demobilisation, and played against the Indian cricket team. However, those matches were not given Test status. The first Test matches between the countries occurred in 1947–48 after the independence of India, when India toured Australia and played five Tests. Australia won 4–0 and as a result, the Australian Board of Control did not invite the Indians back for two decades, fearing that a series of one-sided contests would lead to financial losses due to lack of spectator interest. In the meantime, Australia toured India in late 1956, 1959–60 and 1964–65.

The 1969–70 series in India, which Australia won, were marred by repeated riots. Some were against the Australian team specifically, after the Indian umpires had ruled against the Indian team, while others were not related to on-field conduct, such as a lack of tickets. Several players were hit by projectiles, including captain Bill Lawry, who was hit with a chair. On one occasion, the Australian bus was stoned. The Communist Party of India (CPI), a major political party in West Bengal, protested against Australian batsman Doug Walters, who they mistakenly thought had fought against the communist Vietcong. Around 10,000 communists picketed the Australians' hotel in Calcutta and some eventually broke in and vandalised it. Towards the end of the tour, many former Australian players, some of them administrators, called for the tour to be abandoned for safety reasons, saying that cricket should not descend into violence.

From 1970 until 1996, Australia only toured India twice for Tests. However, with the financial rise of the Board of Control for Cricket in India, Australia, the country with the most successful playing record in the world, has sought more regular fixtures. Test series have occurred every two years for the last decade, and one-day series even more frequently. Scholarships are also given to talented young Indian cricketers to train at the Australian Cricket Academy.

In January 2008, relations became strained after the second test in Sydney. The match, which ended in a last-minute Australian victory, was marred by a series of umpiring controversies, and belligerent conduct between some of the players. At the end of the match, Harbhajan Singh was charged with racially abusing Andrew Symonds, who had been subjected to monkey chants by Indian crowds on a tour a few months earlier. Harbhajan was initially found guilty and given a ban, and the Board of Control for Cricket in India threatened to cancel the tour. Harbhajan's ban was later repealed upon appeal and the tour continued. Both teams were heavily criticised for their conduct.  During Australia's tour in India there were a number of controversies instigated on both sides, culminating in Virat Kohli saying his friendship with Australia coming to an end. He later clarified the comments and said “I thought that was the case, but it has changed for sure. As I said, in the heat of the battle you want to be competitive but I’ve been proven wrong.  The thing I said before the first Test [about being mates with Australia], that has certainly changed and you won’t hear me say that ever again.”

However cricket, and more recently Indian Premier League has been considered "the lifeblood of the Australia-India relationship", and Australian cricketers like Shane Warne, Adam Gilchrist and Brett Lee are immensely popular among the Indian people. Likewise, Sachin Tendulkar is highly regarded among Australian cricket lovers.

In March 2023, PM Narendra Modi hosted his counterpart PM Anthony Albanese at Narendra Modi stadium on the occasion of fourth test match of Border Gavaskar trophy. The event was organized as a tribute to the 75 years of diplomatic and cricket relations between two the countries. The two PMs visited the "Hall of fame" museum inside the stadium.

Hockey

India and Australia also have strong ties to field hockey which came to both countries with the British military.  In India from the mid-19th century, British army regiments played the game which was subsequently picked up by their India regimental counterparts.  The country's first hockey club was formed in Calcutta in 1885–86.  Hockey in Australia was introduced by British naval officers in the late 19th century.  Evidence of the first organised hockey there was the establishment of the South Australian Hockey Association in 1903.

Teams from both countries have been among the top in the world for many years and have therefore frequently encountered each other on the hockey field.  India dominated world hockey between 1928 and 1956, with the men's team winning six consecutive Olympic gold medals. The women's team won gold in 2002 Commonwealth Games, 2003 Afro-Asian Games and 2004 Asia Cup.  Australia has found success mainly since the late 1970s, with the men's and women's teams winning gold medals at Olympic Games, World Cup, Champion's Trophy and Commonwealth Games meets.

The first international match between the two countries and the first international match played in Australia was at Richmond Cricket Ground in 1935, when the world champion team from India beat Australia 12 goals to one.  The visitors featured hockey supremo Dhyan Chand.

Following the partition of India in 1947, Anglo-Indian brothers Julian, Eric, Cec, Mel and Gordon Pearce, emigrated to Australia from India.  All five went on to become successful international players for their adopted country.
When India faced Australia in the 1960 Rome Olympics, The great Leslie Claudius an Anglo-Indian captained India, his opposite number Kevin Carton also an Anglo Indian was the captain of the Australian national team who lost 0–1 to India.

Expatriates

Non-resident Indian and person of Indian origin 

India has the largest diaspora population in the world, and many live in Australia. Non resident Indians (NRI) and Persons of Indian Origin (PIO) maintain strong cultural and economic links with India.  However, the Constitution of India does not allow dual citizenship, so for many expatriates taking up residency, and eventually citizenship in Australian, this has led to loss of privileges in India, such as residency rights. India is one of the few remaining countries that prevent dual citizenship, and there have been attempts to resolve this, through Long Term Visas and more recently a pseudo citizenship Overseas Citizenship of India (OCI) has been created that has been taken up positively, with many Australians OCIs, cricketer Shaun Tait being a famous example, who are able to take residency in India without applying for a visa. However privileges of OCI holders depends on the Government policy of the day, and there have been instances where they have been denied additional rights afforded to full Indian citizens, such as during the 2016 Indian banknote demonetisation where non-citizens, including OCIs were denied rights to bring rupee notes back into the country.

Issues and controversies 

There have been a number of incidents concerning citizens of both countries that received media attention:

 2007 - Mohamed Haneef, was falsely accused of terrorism related crimes. He was later released and compensated.

 2009 - Attacks on Indian students, including the murder of Indian graduate and Australian permanent resident Nitin Garg in 2010

 A number of Overseas trained doctors in Australia of Indian origin have been accused (sometimes unfairly) of professional violations.

Treaties 

A number of treaties before Indian independence or Australian federation are still honoured, such as extradition treaties and criminal cooperation. Since Indian independence, there have been several treaties between the two countries:
 Postal, Money Order and Air service treaties.
 Commonwealth of Nations treaties.
 Cooperative aid to other countries.
 Mutual protection of Patents in 1963.
 A cultural agreement in 1971.
 An agreement to discuss trade in 1976
 Science and Technology cooperation agreements in 1975 and 1986.
 Australia has been involved with peace keeping missions between India and Pakistan.
 Taxation cooperation treaties in 1983, 1991, and 2011.
 Development cooperation agreement in 1990.
 Promoting and protecting investments in 2000.
 Peaceful use of Nuclear Energy in 2014 in order to purchase uranium from Australia.
 A Social Security agreement in 2016.

Resident diplomatic missions

 Australia has a High Commission in New Delhi and consulates-general in Chennai, Kolkata and Mumbai.
 India has a High Commission in Canberra and consulates-general in Melbourne, Perth and Sydney.

See also

 Indian Australians
 Australians in India
 Anti-Indian sentiment in Australia
 Quadrilateral Security Dialogue
 Non-resident Indian and person of Indian origin

Links 

 PM Narendra Modi being accorded a Ceremonial Welcome at Australian Parliament, Canberra

References

Further reading

 Grand Stakes: Australia’s Future between China and India by Rory Medcalf, Strategic Asia 2011-12: Asia Responds to Its Rising Powers - China and India (September 2011)
  review
 
 

 
Australia and the Commonwealth of Nations
India and the Commonwealth of Nations
Bilateral relations of Australia
Australia